Mall walking is a form of exercise in which people walk or jog through the usually long corridors of shopping malls as a substitute for a running track or other walking venue. Many malls open early so that people may mall walk; stores and other such facilities generally do not open at this time, though vending machine concessions are available. Many choose to mall walk as the indoor climate is comfortable, secure, and there is easy access to amenities, such as benches, toilets, Wi-Fi for fitness tracking and media access, and water fountains. Others are attracted to mall walking strictly for the opportunity to spectate other visitors of the mall. Clean and level surfaces also provide a safe walking environment.

Mall walking is undertaken individually, in groups, or as part of an organized mall walking program. Mall walking in the United States is especially popular amongst senior citizens. Many mall walkers cite the camaraderie of walking in groups.

In popular culture 
Mall walking was featured in the television show Better Call Saul on episode "Fall".

References

External links
 "The art of mall walking", Annie Baxter, Minnesota Public Radio

Physical exercise
Shopping mall activities and events
Walking
Indoor sports